Talış (also, Talysh) is a village and municipality in the Shamkir Rayon of Azerbaijan.  It has a population of 603.

References 

Populated places in Shamkir District